Bringin' It All Back Home is an album by the American musician Johnny Copeland. It was released in 1985. Copeland supported the album with a North American tour.

Production
Copeland recorded the album in March 1984 in Abidjan, Ivory Coast, where he collaborated with African musicians. It was produced by his manager, Dan Doyle. Bringin' It All Back Home is considered the first time an American blues musician recorded an album in Africa. Copeland decided to record there after his 1982 tour of the continent; many of the album's songs were inspired by the trek. Copeland included African percussion and the kora on many of the tracks.

Critical reception

Robert Christgau wrote that the band "finds a groove somewhere between an airborne Congolese rumba and a Gulf Coast shuffle with some tricky dance figures thrown in." The Chicago Tribune noted that "African rhythms and instruments wind their way in and out of Copeland's more familiar Texas blues, sometimes seeming exotic, other times seeming perfectly normal." The New York Times stated that Copeland "sings with a strong, persuasive urgency," and concluded that he "comfortably extended his reach by working with an African rhythm section."

The Globe and Mail determined that "the singer-guitarist's music at its best moves, and the accompanying horn and rhythm sections here prove a cumbersome weight on the motion." The Toronto Star deemed the album "compelling listening, an almost off-handed synthesis of African roots music and raw, elemental blues."

Track listing

Personnel 
Musicians
 Johnny Copeland – guitar, vocals
 Michael Merritt – bass
 Jimmy Wormworth – drums
 Jimmy Hyacinthe, Joel Perry, and Malina – guitars
 Halial, Jean-Claude Kungnon, and Souliman Moamed – percussion
 Koffi Assalé – alto saxophone
 Bert McGowan – tenor saxophone
 Emmet King – trombone
 Ben Bierman – trumpet
 Ken Vangel – piano
 Djeli Mousa – kora (tracks 4 and 5)

Technical
 Dan Doyle – producer, liner notes
 Émile Valognes and Pamphile de Souza – recording engineers
 Dominique Samarcq – mixing engineer
 George Peckham – mastering engineer
 Ken Vangel – arrangement
 Steve Billington – design
 Albert Loudes – photography
 Souleymane Coulibaly – technical assistance

References

Johnny Copeland albums
1985 albums
Rounder Records albums
Texas blues albums
Folk albums by American artists